The puna mouse (Punomys lemminus) is a species of rodent in the family Cricetidae. It is endemic to southern Peru, where it is found in puna habitat at elevations of 4400 to 4900 m in the Cordillera Occidental.

References

Musser, G. G. and M. D. Carleton. 2005. Superfamily Muroidea. pp. 894–1531 in Mammal Species of the World a Taxonomic and Geographic Reference. D. E. Wilson and D. M. Reeder eds. Johns Hopkins University Press, Baltimore.

Punomys
Mammals of Peru
Mammals described in 1943
Taxonomy articles created by Polbot